Arthur Middleton (1742–1787) was an American Revolutionary War figure.

Arthur Middleton may also refer to:

 Arthur Middleton (1681–1737), acting governor of South Carolina
 Arthur Middleton (bass-baritone) (1880–1929), American opera singer
 Arthur Edward Middleton (1891–1953), British politician